Addison Henry Laflin (October 24, 1823 – September 24, 1878) was an American politician from New York.

Life
Born in Lee, Berkshire County, Massachusetts, he attended the common schools, was graduated from Williams College in 1843, went to Herkimer County, New York in 1849 and became interested in papermaking.

He was a member of the New York State Senate (20th D.) in 1858 and 1859. He was elected as a Republican to the 39th, 40th and 41st United States Congresses, holding office from March 4, 1865, to March 3, 1871. He was a delegate to the Republican state convention of 1867.

He was appointed by President Ulysses S. Grant as Naval Officer of the Port of New York on April 3, 1871, and held that position until 1877, when he resigned. Laflin died in Pittsfield, Massachusetts in 1878, and was buried at the Oakwood Cemetery in Syracuse.

References

1823 births
1878 deaths
Williams College alumni
Republican Party New York (state) state senators
People from Lee, Massachusetts
Republican Party members of the United States House of Representatives from New York (state)
19th-century American politicians
Burials at Oakwood Cemetery (Syracuse, New York)